Norea is a figure in Gnostic cosmology. Sometimes she is said to be the syzygy of Adam, or wife of Noah, and daughter of Eve. Norea is perceived within gnostic thought as Sophia after her fall from grace.

For a long time, Norea was known from a summary of a book called Noria in the Panarion (Against Heresies) of Epiphanius of Salamis (26.1.3-9). According to Epiphanius, the Borborites identified Norea with Pyrrha, the wife of Deucalion (a Greek figure similar to Noah), because nura means "fire" in Syriac. She burned Noah's Ark three times, then revealed the means of recovering stolen sparks through sexual emissions. Elsewhere (39.5.2) Epiphanius says that the Sethians consider Horaia to be the wife of Seth.

More information has been available since the discovery of the Nag Hammadi library in 1945. In The Hypostasis of the Archons (The Reality of the Rulers), Norea is the daughter of Eve and the younger sister of Seth; both are members of the pure race. The archons decide to destroy the world with a deluge, but their leader, the Demiurge, warns Noah to build an ark, which Norea tries to board. Noah stops her, so she blows upon the ark and sets it ablaze. The rulers try to rape her, but she cries to the God of the Entirety for help. The angel Eleleth appears and frightens the rulers away before revealing her origins; she is a child of the spirit.

Another Nag Hammadi text, the Thought of Norea (or Ode on Norea) is a first-person account of Norea's plea to God. On the Origin of the World refers to the reader an Account of Oraia and the First Book of Noraia, one of which may be the same as the Book of Noria mentioned by Epiphanius.

She has several similar names, including Orea and Horaia, meaning "beautiful". The name is thought to derive from a translation of Naamah, a Hebrew name that means "pleasant." The demon Naamah is called "the younger Lilith." Both Norea and Lilith call upon God to avoid an unwanted sexual encounter.

References 
Robinson, James, ed. The Nag Hammadi Library in English. 3rd edition. San Francisco: Harper and Row, 1988. (Introductions to the translations of some texts include information about Norea)
Stroumsa, Gedaliahu A. G. Another Seed: Studies in Gnostic Mythology. Nag Hammadi Studies 24. Leiden: E. J. Brill, 1984.
Elaine Pagels & Karen King Reading Judas – The Gospel and the Shaping of Christianity. Viking Penguin, 2007. – German edition: Das Evangelium des Verräters – Judas und der Kampf um das wahre Christentum. –  Verlag dtv, 2011. – loc. cit. p. 133.

Gnosticism
Gnostic deities
Children of Adam and Eve